Roman Shandruk (born 29 May 1998 in Ukraine) is a professional Ukrainian football midfielder who plays for the Ukrainian amateur club Votrans Lutsk.

Shandruk is a product of the FC Volyn Youth Sportive School System. Then he signed a professional contract with  FC Volyn Lutsk in the Ukrainian Premier League.

He made his debut in the Ukrainian Premier League for FC Volyn on 20 November 2016, playing in the match against FC Zirka Kropyvnytskyi.

References

External links
Profile at Official FFU Site (Ukr)

Living people
1998 births
Ukrainian footballers
Association football midfielders
Ukrainian Premier League players
FC Volyn Lutsk players